Half-open may refer to:
 Half-open file in chess
 Half-open vowel, a class of vowel sound

Computing and mathematics 
 Half-open interval, an interval containing only one of its endpoints
 Half-open line segment, a line segment containing only one of its endpoints
 TCP half-open, a TCP connection out of synchronization

See also 
 Half-closed
 Clopen